The 1957–58 Bahraini Premier League was won by Muharraq Club.

References
RSSSF

Bahraini Premier League seasons
Bahrain
football